Sinibotia is a genus of loaches found in rivers and streams of eastern Asia, specifically southeast China, Laos, Vietnam and east Thailand.  There are currently six recognized species in this genus.

Species
There are currently six recognized species in this genus:
 Sinibotia longiventralis (J. X. Yang & Y. R. Chen, 1992)
 Sinibotia pulchra (H. W. Wu, 1939)
 Sinibotia reevesae (H. W. Chang, 1944)
 Sinibotia robusta (H. W. Wu, 1939)
 Sinibotia superciliaris (Günther, 1892)
 Sinibotia zebra (H. W. Wu, 1939)

References

Botiidae
Fish of Southeast Asia